Jansma is a West Frisian patronymic surname cognate to "Johnson". People with this surname include:

 Bintje Jansma (1888–1976), Dutch elementary school student after whom her teacher named the potato cultivar Bintje
 Esther Jansma (born 1958), Dutch writer and archaeologist
  (born 1962), Dutch bridge player
 Kristopher Jansma (born 1982), American writer and novelist
 Rik Jansma (born before 2006), Dutch chef and co-founder of the restaurant Basiliek in Harderwijk, Netherlands
 Sijtse Jansma (1898–1977), Dutch tug of war competitor who competed in the 1920 Summer Olympics
 Sybren Jansma (born 1982), Dutch bobsledder who has competed in the Winter Olympics
 Timothy J. Jansma (1952–2006), American luthier

References

Surnames of Dutch origin
Surnames of Frisian origin
Patronymic surnames